In enzymology, an acylpyruvate hydrolase is an enzyme that catalyzes the chemical reaction

a 3-acylpyruvate + H2O  a carboxylate + pyruvate

Thus, the two substrates of this enzyme are 3-acylpyruvate and water, whereas its two products are carboxylate and pyruvate.

This enzyme belongs to the family of hydrolases, specifically those acting on carbon-carbon bonds in ketonic substances.  The systematic name of this enzyme class is 3-acylpyruvate acylhydrolase. This enzyme participates in tyrosine metabolism.

References

 

EC 3.7.1
Enzymes of unknown structure